Richard Oldfield (born 1950) is an American film and television actor who has worked mostly in Britain.

Born in the US, Oldfield moved to Britain in the 1960s. His stage debut was in the musical Hair at the Shaftesbury Theatre in London's West End in 1969. This was followed by a screen appearance in ITV's Thriller (1973), and his first feature film was Emily (1976), in which he played an American visitor pursuing Emily (Koo Stark). Between 1976 and 1977 he appeared as Burford Puckett of the United States Air Force in the British television serial Yanks Go Home. In 1979 he was in The Golden Lady opposite Ina Skriver, with whom he had also worked in Emily.

In 1980 Oldfield became a minor but notable figure in the Star Wars saga, appearing as Rebel fighter pilot Hobbie Klivian in The Empire Strikes Back and delivering the line to Carrie Fisher “Two fighters against a Star Destroyer?”

In 1981 he was Brother Simeon in Omen III: The Final Conflict and went on to appear in Ragtime (1981), The Lords of Discipline (1983), Scream for Help (1984), The Razor's Edge (1984), and Lifeforce (1985).

Film and television credits
Thriller: Ring Once for Death (1973) : Piers Fane
Emily (1976) : James Wise
Yanks Go Home (1976-1977) : Burford Puckett
The Golden Lady (1979) : Wayne Bentley
The Martian Chronicles (1980) : Captain Nathaniel York 
Star Wars The Empire Strikes Back (1980) : Rebel Derek “Hobbie” Klivian (Rogue 4)
Omen III: The Final Conflict (1981) : Brother Simeon
Ragtime (1981) : Stock Reporter
The Lords of Discipline (1983) : TAC Officer
Scream for Help (1984) : Policeman
The Razor's Edge (1984) : Doug Van Allen
Lifeforce (1985) : Mission Leader
From the Mouths of Babes (documentary, 2016) : Himself
The Allman Brothers Band: Live at Great Woods (documentary, 1992) : production assistant
The Singing Forest (2003) : synchronization representative and post-production consultant (as Rich Oldfield)

References

American male film actors
1950 births
Living people